

1983/84 States and Divisions Football Championship

Group A 

Second Place Playoff

Group B

Semi - Final

Final 

        *Champion

Football in Myanmar
1983 in Burmese football
1984 in Burmese football